Tossal d'Orenga is a mountain of the Serra d'En Celler range, Valencian Community, Spain.
Its name means literally "Peak of Oregano" in Catalan, owing to the presence of the herb in its slopes. 

Located within the Ares del Maestrat municipal term, in a relatively uninhabited area, close to the CV-12 road, it is a popular mountain among those who do paragliding in the region.

See also
Albocàsser
Mountains of the Valencian Community

References

External links 
 Zonas de Vuelo - Tossal d'Orenga
 Turimaestrat

Alt Maestrat
Mountains of the Valencian Community